Nalagarh is a city and a municipal committee, near the city of Solan in Solan district in the Indian state of Himachal Pradesh.

Geography 

History 
The Fort of Nalagarh was built in 1421 during the reign of Raja Bikram Chand on a hillock at the foothills of the mighty Himalayas. It affords a panoramic view of the Shivalik hills beyond the Sirsa river and gave its name to the state. Nalagarh enjoyed indirect rule during the British Raj as a non-salute state.

In the early twentieth century, Nalagarh State was one of the Simla hill states, under the government of Punjab. The country was overrun by Gurkhas for some years before 1815, when they were driven out by the British, and the raja was confirmed in possession of the territory. Grain and opium were the main agricultural products.

Rulers

Governance 
Nalagarh is a municipal council with 9 wards. Nalagarh area touches the areas of Ropar and Anandpur Sahib of Punjab.

Demographics 
 India census, Nalagarh had a population of 9,433. Males constitute 54% of the population and females 46%. Nalagarh has an average literacy rate of 76%, higher than the national average of 59.5%: male literacy is 80%, and female literacy is 72%. 12% of the population is under 6.

In the 1961 Census of India, 78.4% of the Nalagarh tehsil of the then Ambala district registered as Hindi-speaking, 14.8% as Punjabi-speakers and 6.4% as Pahari-speaking.

According to 2011 census, the Nalagarh Municipal Council has population of 10,708 of which 5,739 are males while 4,969 are females. Children age 0-6 number 1296 or 12.10%. The Female Sex Ratio is 866 against state average of 972. The Child Sex Ratio is around 914 compared to Himachal Pradesh state average of 909. Literacy rate is 90.03% higher than state average of 82.80%. Male literacy is around 93.07% while female literacy rate is 86.51%.

Economy 
4,291 residents were engaged in work or business activity. Of this 3,309 were males while 982 were females. 93.08% were engaged in Main Work while 6.92% were engaged in Marginal Work.

References

External links 
 WorldStatesmen - India - Princely States - K-Z
 

Cities and towns in Solan district
Princely states of India